Crossotus strigifrons is a species of beetle in the family Cerambycidae. It was described by Fairmaire in 1886.

References

stigmaticus
Beetles described in 1886